The Rural Municipality of Ritchot is a rural municipality in the Winnipeg Capital Region, bordering the south side of Winnipeg in Manitoba, Canada. The separately-administered town of Niverville lies adjacent to its southeast, between it and the Rural Municipality of Hanover.

Water 
Due to population growth within the R.M., an application to expand and improve the water distribution system was made in 2017. The C$5 million project would involve twinning of the distribution pipe between Ste. Agathe and St. Adolphe, twinning of the distribution pipe between Ste. Agathe and Grande Pointe, expansion of the Water Treatment Plant tank to store 1 additional megalitre, and a wider pipe to allow for a 50-litre per second flow from the well.

Climate

Demographics 

Although once it was predominantly French, 35.4% of the municipality's population spoke French in 2016.

Government 
Ritchot is a municipal style government with four councillors and one head of council, known as the mayor. The four councillors represent wards. Ward 1 is formed by the Île des Chênes area, Ward 2 by the St. Adolphe area, Ward 3 by the areas south of PR 210 including Ste. Agathe and Ward 4 by the areas north of PR 210, including Howden and Grande Pointe.  The municipal offices are located in St. Adolphe.

Members
The council of the RM include:
 Mayor: Chris Ewen
 Councillor/Deputy Mayor: Shane Pelletier (Ward 1)
 Councillor: Ron Mamchuk (Ward 2)
 Councillor: Curtis Claydon (Ward 3)
 Councillor: Janine Boulanger (Ward 4)

Communities
 Glenlea
 Grande Pointe
 Howden
 Île-des-Chênes
 St. Adolphe
 Ste. Agathe

References

External links
 Rural Municipality of Ritchot
 Map of Ritchot R.M. at Statcan

Ritchot
Ritchot